Dr. Mary Hill Fulstone (August 3, 1892 – December 2, 1987) was an American physician. When she retired from practicing medicine at the age of 91, she was the longest-practicing physician in the state of Nevada. She was born in Eureka, and graduated from University of California, Berkeley (undergraduate and medical school). Known as "Dr. Mary", Fulstone was honored as Nevada's Mother of the Year (1950), Nevada's Doctor of the Year (1961), and Distinguished Nevadan (University of Nevada, 1964). She died on December 2, 1987 at her Smith Valley home.

References

1892 births
1987 deaths
People from Eureka, Nevada
20th-century American women physicians
20th-century American physicians
Physicians from Nevada
University of California, Berkeley alumni